Eremophila chamaephila, commonly known as earth-loving poverty bush, is a flowering plant in the figwort family, Scrophulariaceae, and is endemic to the south-west of Western Australia. It is a low, dense, spreading shrub with small, fleshy leaves and mauve to purple flowers.

Description
The leaves are arranged alternately along lumpy branches and are themselves lumpy on the lower side.

The flowers are borne singly in leaf axils and lack a stalk. The petal tube is purple on its outside surface and white, spotted purple inside. The outer surface is glabrous, but the inside is hairy with the hairiness continuing onto the lower petal lobe and the 4 stamens extend slightly beyond the end of the petal tube.

Taxonomy and naming
The species was first formally described by Ludwig Diels in 1905 and the description was published in Botanische Jahrbücher für Systematik, Pflanzengeschichte und Pflanzengeographie. The specific epithet chamaephila means "lowly-" or "creeping-loving"  referring to the low-growing habit of this species.

Distribution and habitat
Eremophila chamaephila occurs north of Esperance in the area between Ravensthorpe and Grass Patch in the Esperance Plains and Mallee biogeographic regions. It grows in sand or clay, often in disturbed sites like roadsides.

Conservation status
Eremophila chamaephila is classified as "Priority Three" by the Western Australian Government Department of Parks and Wildlife, meaning that it is poorly known and known from only a few locations but is not under imminent threat.

Use in horticulture
Earth-loving poverty bush is an ideal small, compact shrub for a very low hedge, along the edge of a footpath or as an understorey container plant. It can be grown from cuttings, taking several months to form roots in warmer weather or can be grafted onto Myoporum species. It prefers well-drained soil but is drought tolerant and frost hardy.

References

chamaephila
Eudicots of Western Australia
Plants described in 1905
Endemic flora of Western Australia